One Thousand and One Nights is a collection of Middle Eastern folk tales compiled in Arabic during the Islamic Golden Age.

1001 Nights may also refer to:
 1001 Nights (1968 film), a film directed by José María Elorrieta
 1001 Nights (1990 film), a French-Italian fantasy film
 1001 Nights (TV series), a Canadian animated television series
 1001 Nights (audio drama), an audio drama based on the British science fiction television series Doctor Who